Euphorbia bemarahaensis is a species of plant in the family Euphorbiaceae. It is endemic to Madagascar.  It is threatened by habitat loss.

References

Endemic flora of Madagascar
bemarahaensis
Vulnerable plants
Taxonomy articles created by Polbot